Pehchaan is a Pakistani drama television series which aired on Hum TV in 2006. The serial was directed by Mehreen Jabbar and written by Azra Babar. The serial follows the journey of three expatriates who find their true identities. It stars Sonia Rehman, Ismail Bashey, Rehan Sheikh, Deepti Gupta and Nasreen Qureshi in lead roles. It tackles the themes such as miseries of women married to foreigners, problems of adopted children and people with lost identities. 

It again aired on the channel in 2011 as a soap serial (splitting each episodes into two episodes of approximately 20 minutes) with a new title Aks.

Plot Summary
Pehchaan is the journey of three friends, Nina, Amir and Kiran who are expatriates living in New York and discover their true identities. Amir is caught in a cold marriage and is attracted to Nina, who knows his conditions. Kiran is fleeing from her life partner and goes to America to live with Nina. She engages with Asad who is a road artist and a RJ on a nearby radio broadcast. The serial also deals with the story of film star, Sam who is Nina's real mother but Nina is unaware of it.

Cast
 Sonia Rehman as Nina
 Rehan Sheikh as Asad
 Deepti Gupta as Kira
 Ismail Bashey as Amir
 Nasreen Qureshi as Sam
 Neshmia Alam (Child) 
 Minha Warsi
 Khalid Nizami
 Padma Khanna
 Sunny Sharif
 Ritu Mishra
 Bittou Walia
 Chanda Gangwani

Production 

Rehman was selected to play the lead role in the series and, she was approached by director Jabbar in U.S. It marked the debut of Indian actress Deepti Gupta, who later went to starred in other Pakistani TV dramas, such as Manay Na Ye Dil, (2007) Malaal (2009) and Neeyat (2011). Besides Gupta, the series also features some other foreign actors including American and Indian ones. It was the final collaboration of Jabbar with writer Babar after which the latter didn't write any script, with their previous collaborators include Putli Ghar, Zaib un Nisa and Amma, Abba aur Ali.

Accolades

References

2006 Pakistani television series debuts
2006 Pakistani television series endings
Pakistani drama television series
Urdu-language television shows
Hum TV original programming
Pakistani television series endings